The Temple of Seti I may refer to the
 Mortuary Temple of Seti I in the Theban Necropolis near Luxor, Egypt
 Temple of Seti I in Abydos, Egypt

See also
 KV17, the tomb of Seti I in the Valley of the Kings